Herten is a village in the southeastern Netherlands. It is located in the municipality of Roermond, Limburg.

History 
The village was first mentioned in the middle of the 11th century as Hercena. The etymology is unknown. Herten developed in the Middle Ages along the Maas. In 1716, it became part of the Austrian Upper Guelders.

The Catholic St Michael Church was originally from the 13th century. In 1881, the tower collapsed and a new church was built in Gothic Revival style.

Herten was home to 153 people in 1840. It was severely damaged during World War II. After the war, it became a commuter's village for Roermond. Herten was a separate municipality until 1991, when it was merged with Roermond. The municipality also covered the smaller villages of Merum and Ool. Even though Roermond and Herten have formed a single urban area, Herten is a separate village.

Gallery

References

Populated places in Limburg (Netherlands)
Former municipalities of Limburg (Netherlands)
Roermond